The 2016–17 Virginia Cavaliers men's basketball team represented the University of Virginia during the 2016–17 NCAA Division I men's basketball season, in their 112th season of play. The team was led by head coach Tony Bennett, in his eighth year, and played their home games at John Paul Jones Arena as members of the Atlantic Coast Conference. They finished the season 23–11, 11–7 in ACC play to finish in ACC play to finish in a tie for fifth place. They defeated Pittsburgh in the second round of the ACC tournament to advance to the quarterfinals where they lost to Notre Dame. They received an at-large bid to the NCAA tournament as the No. 5 seed in the East region. There they defeated UNC Wilmington in the First Round before losing in the Second Round to Florida.

Previous season
Coming off of two highly successful regular seasons in 2014 and 2015, but with early exits from the NCAA tournament each time, and with the final season for seniors Malcolm Brogdon and Anthony Gill, expectations were high for the program in 2015–16. However, the regular season was mixed: despite wins against programs like West Virginia, Villanova, California, and North Carolina, the team also suffered upsets to Virginia Tech, Georgia Tech, and Florida State. Despite this, the Cavaliers finished the season 29–8 overall and 13–5 in conference play, finishing in second place in the ACC. They fell in the ACC tournament championship to North Carolina. However, they received an at-large bid to the NCAA tournament, and received their second No. 1 seed in three years. In the Tournament, they defeated Hampton, Butler, and Iowa State to advance to their first Elite Eight in twenty-one years. There, they lost to Syracuse, despite leading by 14 at halftime.

Offseason

Departures

2016 recruiting class

Roster

Depth chart

Schedule and results 

|-
!colspan=12 style=| Spain exhibition games

|-
!colspan=12 style=| Regular season

  |-
!colspan=12 style=| ACC Tournament

|-
!colspan=12 style=| NCAA tournament

Rankings

*AP does not release post-NCAA tournament rankings

References

Virginia Cavaliers men's basketball seasons
Virginia
Virginia Cavaliers men's basketball
Virginia
2017 in sports in Virginia